Earl J. Harris Jr. is an American politician serving as a member of the Indiana House of Representatives from the 2nd district. He assumed office on November 9, 2016.

Early life and education
Harris is a native of East Chicago, Indiana. He earned a Bachelor of Arts degree in telecommunications from Indiana University Bloomington and a Master of Arts in telecommunications and digital storytelling from Ball State University.

Career 
Harris worked as a programming producer for Fox Sports Midwest and PBS. He was also the president of the Educational Television Cooperative before founding Motivation Media, a company that produces marketing and communication materials. Harris was elected to the Indiana House of Representatives in November 2016. He also serves as assistant Democratic floor leader and vice chair of the Indiana Black Legislative Caucus.

References

Living people
People from East Chicago, Indiana
Indiana University Bloomington alumni
Ball State University alumni
Democratic Party members of the Indiana House of Representatives
African-American state legislators in Indiana
Year of birth missing (living people)
21st-century African-American people